Roma was the name of three ships of the Regia Marina (Italian Royal Navy), and may refer to:

 , an armoured steam frigate commissioned in 1865 and scrapped in 1896
 , a predreadnought battleship of the Regina Elena class completed in 1908 and stricken in 1927
 , a battleship of the Vittorio Veneto class commissioned in 1942 and sunk in 1943

Italian Navy ship names

it:Roma (disambigua)#Navi_e_aeronavi